Limonium multiflorum is a species of sea-lavender endemic to central-west Portugal, where it inhabits rocky and sandy areas.

Description

References

multiflorum
Endemic flora of Portugal